The 2015–16 Egyptian Second Division was the 36th edition of the Egyptian Second Division, the top Egyptian semi-professional level for football clubs, since its establishment in 1977. The season began on 29 October 2015 and concluded on 21 April 2016.

Al Nasr Lel Taa'en, El Sharkia and Tanta won the Promotion play-offs and secured the promotion to the 2016–17 Egyptian Premier League.

Teams

Group A

Group B

Group C

Group D

Group E

Group F

Standings

Group A

Group B

Group C

Group D

Group E

Group F

Play-offs

Promotion play-offs

Summary
The first legs were played on 16 April, and the second legs were played on 21 April 2016.

|}

Matches

2–2 on aggregate. Al Nasr Lel Taa'den won 3–2 on penalties and promoted to the Egyptian Premier League.

0–0 on aggregate. El Sharkia won 6–5 on penalties and promoted to the Egyptian Premier League.

Tanta won 1–0 on aggregate and promoted to the Egyptian Premier League.

Relegation play-offs

Summary
The matches were played on 17 and 21 April 2016.

|}

Matches

El Senbellawein relegated to the Egyptian Third Division.

Port Fouad relegated to the Egyptian Third Division.

Asyut Petroleum relegated to the Egyptian Third Division.

References

Egyptian Second Division seasons
Egy
Egy
Second Division